Colmata is a village in Tuscany, central Italy, administratively a frazione of the comune of Piombino, province of Livorno. At the time of the 2011 census its population was 152.

Colmata is about 77 km from Livorno and 5 km from Piombino.

References 

Frazioni of Piombino